The W76 is an American thermonuclear warhead, designed for use on the UGM-96 Trident I submarine-launched ballistic missiles (SLBMs) and subsequently moved to the UGM-133 Trident II as Trident I was phased out of service. The first variant, the W76 mod 0 (W76-0) was manufactured from 1978 to 1987, and was gradually replaced by the W76 mod 1 (W76-1) between 2008 and 2018, completely replacing the Mod 0 in the active stockpile. In 2018 it was announced that some Mod 1 warheads would be converted to a new low-yield W76 mod 2 (W76-2) version. The first Mod 2 warheads were deployed in late 2019.

History
The warhead was initially manufactured from 1978 to 1987 and designed by Los Alamos National Laboratory. It was initially fitted to the Trident I SLBM system, but after the Rocky Flats plant where its successor the W88 was being made was shut down in 1989 after a production run of only 400 warheads, it was decided to transfer W76 warheads to Trident II.

A life extension program (LEP) for 800 warheads was approved by the US government in 2000, then later increased to 2,000. The purpose of the LEP was to extend service life by 20 years and add new safety features. Production on the W76-1 started in September 2008 and the National Nuclear Security Administration completed updating all W76-0 warheads to the W76-1 design in December 2018.

The 2018 Nuclear Posture Review announced that a new variant, the W76-2, would be manufactured. The W76-2 variant is described as a low-yield warhead, estimated at about 5-7 kilotons of TNT equivalent. The National Nuclear Security Administration announced that it had started to manufacture the W76-2 in January 2019. Initial operating capability was expected in the final quarter of 2019, and manufacturing is expected to last through FY2024 at the Pantex Plant. According to FAS, the W76-2 warhead was first deployed with  during its late 2019 operational patrol. The US Department of Defense confirmed in February 2020 that W76-2 had been 'fielded'.

The warhead is currently the most numerous weapon in the US nuclear arsenal, having replaced the 50 kt W68 that was fitted to the Poseidon SLBM in that capacity.

The United Kingdom operates a nuclear weapon based on the W76 mod-1 design under the name “Holbrook”.

Design
The W76-0 had a design yield of 100 kt while its replacement the W76-1 has a yield of 90 kt. The W76-2 has an estimated yield of 5 to 7 kt.

The W76-0 was fitted inside a Mk4 reentry vehicle (reentry body in US Navy parlance) while the W76-1 and -2 are fitted inside the new Mk4A reentry vehicle.

During the W76-1 LEP, the warhead was fitted with a new MC4700 arming, fuzing and firing (AF&F) system. The MC4700 AF&F system increases warhead kill probabilities against hard targets such as silos and bunkers. It achieves this by first calculating the range to the target outside of the atmosphere (i.e. before the atmosphere can alter the warhead's trajectory) and then continuously calculates its position on a line based on acceleration. If the contact fuze is actuated (such as falling short or striking on target) the warhead detonates, but if the fuze calculates it has overshot the target it detonates the warhead before it can leave the kill radius of the target (the kill radius is a sphere, not a circle). In comparison, a warhead without such a smart fuze would when overshooting a target, continue flying, leaving kill radius where detonating would destroy the target, and impact the ground which would actuate the impact fuze and detonate the warhead, outside the kill radius.

See also
 RSM-56 Bulava – missile in the Russian arsenal with warheads of comparable yield
 List of nuclear weapons

References

External links
 W76 information at Nuclear Weapon Archive
 W76 information at Global Security
 Imminent House Vote on New Low-Yield Nuclear Weapon | Union of Concerned Scientists

Nuclear warheads of the United States
Military equipment introduced in the 1970s